Oscar Heinrich Daniel Hinsberg (21 October 1857 – 13 February 1939) was a German chemist. 

Hinsberg was born in Berlin. In 1882 he obtained his doctorate in sciences at the University of Tübingen, later serving as a professor at the Universities of Freiburg and Geneva.

He is known for research involving synthesis of oxindole, sulfone and thiophene. In 1890 he introduced the "Hinsberg reaction", a test used for differentiation of primary, secondary and tertiary amines.

Publications 
 Ueber Oxalsäurederivate des Metanitroparatoluidins und des Metaparadiamidotoluols, 1882.
 Ueber die Wirkung des Acetphenetidins, (with internist Alfred Kast 1856-1903). in Centralblatt für die medicinischen Wissenschaften, Berlin, 1887, 25: 145-148. - introduction of phenacetine.

References 

19th-century German chemists
1939 deaths
1857 births
Scientists from Berlin
University of Tübingen alumni
Academic staff of the University of Freiburg
Academic staff of the University of Geneva
20th-century German chemists